David Guez was the defending champion but decided not to participate.
Facundo Bagnis won the final against Victor Hănescu 6–4, 6–4.

Seeds

Draw

Finals

Top half

Bottom half

References
 Main Draw
 Qualifying Draw

BRD Arad Challenger - Singles
2012 Singles